Megachile sudanica is a species of bee in the family Megachilidae. It was described by Magretti in 1898.

References

Sudanica
Insects described in 1898